Jon Robert Lindstrom (born October 18, 1957) is an American actor, writer, director, producer, and musician. He is well known for his roles of Kevin Collins and Ryan Chamberlain on the ABC Daytime soap opera General Hospital and its spin-off Port Charles.

Early life and education 
Lindstrom was born in Medford, Oregon, to Robert, a TV advertising executive, and Suzanne Lindstrom, a homemaker. He has an older brother, Jeff. As a drummer, Lindstrom recorded the album Feel Free to Do So with the band The High Lonesome for the Spark Records label. The record garnered much industry praise and "most-added" status for two singles on the Billboard Hot 100.

Lindstrom attended the University of Oregon, studying theatre and music. Upon graduation, he moved to Los Angeles, where he studied with acting teachers Lee Strasberg, Stella Adler and Jeff Corey.

Personal life 
An active athlete, he is an active member of the Directors Guild of America, the Screen Actors Guild, the Academy of Television Arts & Sciences, and AFTRA.

Lindstrom married soap opera actress Eileen Davidson in 1997, ending in divorce in 2000. He next married his former As the World Turns co-star, Cady McClain, in 2014.

Filmography

Film

Television

Awards and nominations
2013 Winner, Best of Fest ("How We Got Away With It"), Film Fest Twain Harte
2013 Winner, Audience Choice Award for a Feature Film ("How We Got Away With It"), Marina del Rey Film Festival
2013 Finalist, New Filmmakers Forum (NFF) Emerging Director Award ("How We Got Away With It"), St. Louis International Film Festival 
2013 Winner, 1st Runner-up Stolman Audience Award ("How We Got Away With It"), Sonoma International Film Festival
2013 Winner, Best Thriller Feature Film ("How We Got Away With It"), Bare Bones International Film Festival.
2013 Nominated, Best Actor/Filmmaker in a Feature Film, Bare Bones International Film Festival (Jon Lindstrom-"How We Got Away With It")
2013 Nominated, Best Showcase Feature Film ("How We Got Away With It"), SOHO International Film Festival
2009 Winner, Angel Film Award for Best Ensemble Cast ("The Sacrifice"), Monaco International Film Festival (shared With: Molly C. Quinn, Darby Stanchfield, Chris Mulkey and Richard Riehle)

Daytime Emmy Awards 
2011: Pre-Nominated, Outstanding Leading Actor in a Drama Series - As The World Turns
2010: Nominated, Outstanding Leading Actor in a Drama Series - As The World Turns
2010: Pre-Nominated, Outstanding Leading Actor in a Drama Series - As The World Turns
2019: Nominated, Outstanding Leading Actor in a Drama Series - General Hospital
2019: Pre-Nominated, Outstanding Leading Actor in a Drama Series - General Hospital
2020: Nominated, Outstanding Leading Actor in a Drama Series - General Hospital

Soap Opera Digest Awards 
2000: Won, Outstanding Supporting Actor - Port Charles
1994: Nominated, Outstanding Villain/Villainess - General Hospital

References

External links
 
 
 
 
 Jon Lindstrom main page
 Jon Lindstrom at TV.com
 Jon Lindstrom at Soaps.com
 Video Interview with Jon Lindstrom at QFest 2010

1957 births
American male soap opera actors
American male television actors
Living people
Male actors from Oregon
Musicians from Oregon
North Medford High School alumni
People from Medford, Oregon
University of Oregon alumni
20th-century American male actors
21st-century American male actors